Till Death may refer to:

 Till Death..., an ITV sitcom
 Till Death (Lebanese TV series), a Lebanese drama
 Till Death (film), a 2021 film starring Megan Fox
 South of Heaven (film), originally titled Till Death, starring Jason Sudeikis and Evangeline Lilly

See also
 Till Death: Azalea's Wrath, a 2019 Malaysian Malay-language film
 Till Death Do Us Part (disambiguation)
 Til Death (disambiguation)